The 1994 California Secretary of State election occurred on November 8, 1994. The primary elections took place on March 8, 1994. The Republican nominee, State Assemblyman Bill Jones, narrowly defeated the Democratic nominee, acting Secretary of State Tony Miller, who assumed the seat when March Fong Eu resigned to become United States Ambassador to Micronesia.

Primary results
Final results from California Secretary of State.

Democratic

Candidates 

 Tony Miller, Incumbent Acting Secretary of State
 Mike Woo, Former Los Angeles Councilman and candidate for Los Angeles Mayor in 1993
 Gwen Moore, State Assemblywoman

Green

Others

General election results
Final results from the Secretary of State of California.

Results by county

See also
California state elections, 1994
State of California
Secretary of State of California

References

1994 California elections
California Secretary of State elections
California
November 1994 events in the United States